Georg Sigurd Wettenhovi-Aspa (born. Wetterhoff-Asp, 7 May 1870 – 18 February 1946) was a Finnish multiartist: painter, sculptor, writer, and a pseudo-linguist. He is best known for his fantastical theories about the past of the Finnish people, whom he believed to have descended from Ancient Egypt.
 
Born in Helsinki, his parents were Georg August Asp (1834–1901), professor of anatomy at the University of Helsinki and Mathilda Sofia Wetterhoff (1840–1920), developer of female gymnastics.

Wettenhovi-Aspa studied art in Copenhagen in the Royal Danish Academy of Fine Arts from 1888 to 1891. He organized several art shows known as the Free Exhibitions. He died in Helsinki.

References 

1870 births
1946 deaths
Artists from Helsinki
People from Uusimaa Province (Grand Duchy of Finland)
Swedish-speaking Finns
Finnish Freemasons
19th-century Finnish painters
20th-century Finnish painters
Finnish architects
Linguists from Finland
Finnish Egyptologists
Finnish composers
Finnish male composers
19th-century Finnish poets
20th-century Finnish poets
Finnish eugenicists
Finnish inventors
Fennomans
Finnish male poets
20th-century male writers
20th-century Finnish sculptors
19th-century Finnish sculptors
Pseudolinguistics